Saligny is a commune in Constanța County, Northern Dobruja, Romania.

The commune includes three villages: 
 Saligny (historical name: Aziza, Azizia) – named after the Romanian engineer Anghel Saligny
 Făclia (historical name: Facria until 1925)
 Ștefan cel Mare (historical name: Bazaschioi) – named after the Moldavian prince Stephen the Great

Saligny is located in the western part of the county, along the Danube–Black Sea Canal.

Demographics
At the 2011 census, Saligny had 2,086 Romanians (99.76%), 5 others (0.24%).

External links
 Saligny Commune on the website of the Constanța County Board

References

Communes in Constanța County
Localities in Northern Dobruja